Les Gammas! Les Gammas! is an educational television series teaching French as a foreign or second language. It was broadcast on German and Italian television in the 1970s.

See also
List of German television series

External links
 
 A short article on Les Gammas! Les Gammas!

German educational television series
French-language education television programming
1974 German television series debuts
1976 German television series endings
1974 French television series debuts
1976 French television series endings
1970s French television series
Das Erste original programming